Pacorus of Media Atropatene (also spelled Pakorus) was a Parthian prince who ruled Media Atropatene in the mid 1st-century.
 
Pacorus was a son of Vonones II (r. 51). When Vonones II died in 51, his son Vologases I became the new Parthian king. Vologases I sought to continue the policies of the prominent former Parthian king Artabanus II, and thus, one of his first objectives was to strengthen the bolster the Parthian position in strategically and politically unstable regions which had served for decades as the source of war with the Romans. He gave the kingship of Media Atropatene to Pacorus, while the even more politically important kingship of Armenia was given to Vologases I's brother Tiridates.

Little is known of Pacorus' rule in Media Atropatene, except that, in 72, a group of Alans invaded his kingdom and forced him to flee into the mountains. Pacorus was forced to pay the Alans to have his wife and concubines released from captivity. The Alans also invaded Armenia, and nearly captured Tiridates in battle; he was lassoed from a distance and caught, but he quickly managed to whip out his sword and slash the rope in time. The Alans then withdrew with a lot of booty after plundering Armenia and Media Atropatene.

References

Sources
 
 
 
 
 
 
  
 

1st-century monarchs in the Middle East
1st-century Iranian people
Rulers of Media Atropatene
Vassal rulers of the Parthian Empire
Atropatene